Michael Barry Eastwood (born July 1, 1967) is a Canadian former professional ice hockey player. Eastwood played 13 seasons in the National Hockey League for the Toronto Maple Leafs, Winnipeg Jets, Phoenix Coyotes, New York Rangers, St. Louis Blues, Chicago Blackhawks and Pittsburgh Penguins

Playing career
As a youth, Eastwood played in the 1979 Quebec International Pee-Wee Hockey Tournament with a minor ice hockey team from South Ottawa.

Eastwood was drafted in the fifth Round, 91st overall by the Toronto Maple Leafs in the 1987 NHL Entry Draft. He then played four seasons with Western Michigan University of the CCHA. He played 164 games for Western Michigan, scoring 69 goals and adding 80 assists for 149 points. His best season was his last one when he had 29 goals and 32 assists in 42 games. In 1991, Eastwood made the jump to pro hockey. He did not become an NHL regular though until two years later.

In 1995, Eastwood was traded to the Winnipeg Jets for Tie Domi. This started a trend for Eastwood as he would then go on to play for many different teams. In his career, he has played 783 NHL games, scoring 87 goals and adding 149 assists for 236 points. His best season came in 1999–2000, when he scored 19 goals and 15 assists for 34 points.

Post-playing career
After his retirement in 2004, Eastwood was sought out by sports radio producers in the Ottawa area for his perspective on the NHL. He formerly co-hosted Ottawa Senators post-game shows with Scott MacArthur, and has appeared in radio commercials for restaurants in the Ottawa area. He currently serves as an Assistant Coach for the Ottawa 67's in the Ontario Hockey League.

Career statistics

Awards and honours

References

 2005 NHL Official Guide & Record Book

External links
 

1967 births
Living people
Canadian ice hockey centres
Chicago Blackhawks players
Ice hockey people from Ottawa
Nepean Raiders players
New York Rangers players
Phoenix Coyotes players
Pittsburgh Penguins players
St. John's Maple Leafs players
St. Louis Blues players
Toronto Maple Leafs draft picks
Toronto Maple Leafs players
Western Michigan Broncos men's ice hockey players
Winnipeg Jets (1979–1996) players